"Brother Louie" is a song about an interracial love affair between a white man and a black woman, and the subsequent rejection of both by their respective parents because of it. The title was written and sung by Errol Brown and Tony Wilson of the group Hot Chocolate, and was a No. 7 hit in the UK Singles Chart for the band in 1973, produced by Mickie Most. Alexis Korner has a spoken word part in this version of the song. 
Phil Dennys arranged the string section.

Stories cover

"Brother Louie" was covered by the American band Stories (featuring singer Ian Lloyd) about six months after Hot Chocolate's UK hit. The Stories version reached No. 1 on the Billboard Hot 100 in the US and sold a million-plus copies to earn a gold disk.

Chart performance

Weekly charts
Hot Chocolate

Stories

Year-end charts

All-time charts

Quireboys

Other versions
Another cover was released  in 1973 by Roy Ayers on his album Virgo Red, playing vibes instead of singing. It has since been covered by many other artists including The Undisputed Truth, The Quireboys, Peter Beckett, Louie Louie, Matumbi, The Oppressed, Claude François. Vandenberg singer Bert Heerink had a top 10 hit in 1995 in the Netherlands with a Dutch version titled "Julie July". More recently, the song has been covered by Bon Jovi.

Australian hip hop group 1200 Techniques sampled the riff heavily for their single "Karma" in 2002.

In popular culture
The recording by Stories was featured in the film A Guide to Recognizing Your Saints (2006). The same version also appeared in an episode of the series Nip/Tuck. An alternative rendition of the Stories version of the song was included in the soundtrack of the 2007 film Zodiac. It was also on the soundtrack to the 1999 film Dick and in the 2005 French-Canadian film C.R.A.Z.Y, but the song's first movie appearance was in Wim Wenders' 1974 film Alice in the Cities (7:15 into the movie).

The song, with slightly different wording, is used as the theme song to the television series Louie, a sitcom loosely based on the life of American comedian Louis C.K.  The word "cry" was changed to "die" in the second repetition of the chorus. This version was produced by Reggie Watts, with the intro emulating the Hot Chocolate version, and with Stories singer Ian Lloyd reprising his vocals.

The Stories recording is used as walk-up music by New York Mets baseball player Luis Guillorme.

References

External links

 

1973 songs
1973 singles
1993 singles
Hot Chocolate (band) songs
Matumbi (band) songs
Billboard Hot 100 number-one singles
Cashbox number-one singles
Fiction about interracial romance
Songs about black people
Songs about white people
Songs against racism and xenophobia
Songs written by Errol Brown
Song recordings produced by Mickie Most
RAK Records singles
Kama Sutra Records singles
Songs written by Tony Wilson (musician)
RPM Top Singles number-one singles